Mark S. Winfield is a Canadian volunteer credited with founding or co-founding a number of not for profit organizations, including The United Way of Lunenburg County, Nova Scotia.

Winfield is the author of The Essential Volunteer Handbook, which is a guide to the inexperienced or prospective volunteer. In recognition of his domestic and international volunteer efforts, Winfield has been awarded the United Way Canada "Chair's Award of Distinction". and the Queen Elizabeth Diamond Jubilee Medal. Winfield has also published a video entitled What Makes Society Work, which discusses what causes people to volunteer. He is a tax accountant who resides in Pinegrove, Nova Scotia.

References

Canadian accountants
Year of birth missing (living people)
Living people